Cool Air is a town in Umgungundlovu District Municipality in the KwaZulu-Natal province of South Africa.

References

Populated places in the uMshwathi Local Municipality